Luka Pibernik (born 23 October 1993) is a Slovenian former professional cyclist, who rode professionally between 2012 and 2020, for the ,  and  teams. During his professional career, Pibernik took three victories – two wins at the Slovenian National Road Race Championships in 2013 and 2015, and a stage victory at the 2016 Eneco Tour.

He now works as a directeur sportif for UCI Continental team .

Major results
Source: 

2011
 2nd Road race, National Junior Road Championships
2012
 3rd Road race, National Road Championships
 5th Road race, UCI Under-23 Road World Championships
 6th Trofeo Internazionale Bastianelli
 7th Overall Czech Cycling Tour
2013
 1st  Road race, National Road Championships
 1st Stage 2 Czech Cycling Tour
 3rd Overall Peace Race U23
1st  Points classification
 3rd Gran Premio Palio del Recioto
 3rd Grand Prix Královéhradeckého kraje
 4th Gran Premio di Poggiana
 8th Trofeo Internazionale Bastianelli
 8th Trofej Umag
 8th Ronde van Vlaanderen Beloften
2014
 3rd Time trial, National Under-23 Road Championships
 4th Giro del Belvedere
 4th GP Hungary
 7th GP Czech Republic
 7th Gran Premio Palio del Recioto
 7th Raiffeisen Grand Prix
 8th Gran Premio della Costa Etruschi
 8th Gran Premio di Poggiana
 8th Gran Premio della Liberazione
 9th Grand Prix Královéhradeckého kraje
 10th Overall Peace Race U23
2015
 1st  Road race, National Road Championships
2016
 1st Stage 6 Eneco Tour
 4th Road race, National Road Championships
2018
 3rd Road race, National Road Championships

Grand Tour general classification results timeline

References

External links

1993 births
Living people
Slovenian male cyclists
Sportspeople from Ljubljana
European Games competitors for Slovenia
Cyclists at the 2019 European Games
Directeur sportifs